List of Guggenheim Fellowships awarded in 1985

References

1985
1985 awards